Layla Ussayran (1934–2007) was a Lebanese novelist.

She was born in Sidon and received a BA in political science from the American University of Beirut. She worked for the Lebanese publisher Dar Al Sayyad. She was also a correspondent for the Egyptian magazine Rose al-Yūsuf. In 1996, she was named a knight in the National Order of the Cedar.

Selected works 
 Lan Namut Ghadan ("We will not die tomorrow") novel (1962)
 Al-Hiwar al-Akhras ("The mute conversation") novel (1963)
 AI-Madinah al-Farighah ("The empty city") novel (1966)

References 

1934 births
2007 deaths
Lebanese women writers
Lebanese novelists
Lebanese women journalists
Lebanese journalists
Knights of the National Order of the Cedar
20th-century Lebanese writers
20th-century Lebanese women writers
20th-century women writers
20th-century journalists
20th-century novelists
Lebanese women novelists
American University of Beirut alumni